Swim England is the national governing body for swimming, diving, water polo, open water swimming, and synchronised swimming in England. It forms part of British Swimming, a federation of the national governing bodies of England, Scotland (Scottish Amateur Swimming Association), and Wales (Welsh Amateur Swimming Association).  These three are collectively known as the Home Country National Governing Bodies.

History
The first governing body for swimming to ever be established in the world, it was previously known as the 'Amateur Swimming Association' and established in 1869, with headquarters at Harold Fern House in Loughborough. It was registered as a company on 18 May 1982. It moved in April 2010, along with British Swimming, to SportPark at Loughborough University, close to the A512 and junction 23 of the M1.

The ASA underwent a rebranding exercise in 2008 including a new logo and name of the asa.  After negative reaction the logo was retained but the organisation returned to using The ASA in text form.

On 3 March 2017, a new strategy was released for swimming within England. Part of that was to again re-brand The ASA to its current name 'Swim England'. At the same time Jane Nickerson was announced as the organisation's new Chief Executive Officer.

Function

Clubs
Swim England supports over 1,200 affiliated swimming clubs through a National/Regional/and sub-regional structure. It endeavors to ensure every athlete, regardless of age or experience, belongs to a club that provides the best possible support and environment.  Swim England has introduced a Quality Mark for clubs called 'Swim 21 Accreditation'.

Safety
In October 2015, Swim England partnered with Water Babies and Splash About International to introduce new national guidelines for baby and toddler safety in swimming pools. The guidelines were published by the British Standards Institution and aimed to set industry-wide standards for swimming lessons and underwater photography practices.

Competitions
Swim England organises competitions throughout England, from age-group to elite level.  The Age Group and Youth Championships are aimed at younger swimmers aged between 11 and 17 years and can attract more than 1,600 participants, while the ASA National Championships are aimed at the elite swimmers.

Swim England also organizes the English talent programme that puts in place performance opportunities for swimmers to develop their skills and potential.

Participation
Swim England operates a Learn to Swim award scheme based on the National Plan for Teaching Swimming. Swimmers within the Swim England programme work their way through 7 stages where fundamental swimming skills are learnt, with progression then expected to be made through stages 8, 9, and 10 where swimmers learn how to train; club swimming; Diving (sport); rookie life guarding; Synchronised swimming; or water polo.

Swim England is not a provider of swimming facilities, but aims to act as a catalyst and facilitator to ensure suitable facilities, with appropriate access and programmes, are provided to meet the needs of the community and aquatic clubs.

Swim England operates certification and education programmes for teachers, coaches and officials. It has created the UK Coaching Framework and e-learning programmes, designed to ensure the ASA has an appropriately skilled workforce for the whole swimming industry. Its education is provided by its Institute of Swimming

Structure
As well as being a governing body, Swim England also operates several subsidiary companies. It is split into 8 regions:
 North East
 North West
 West Midlands
 East Midlands
 East
 South West
 London
 South East

Swim England's income for the year to 31 March 2009 was £11.4 million, its largest sources of income being government grants (e.g. from Sport England) and revenue from its swimming award scheme.

Swimming championships

Swim England holds three different indoor national swimming championships: one for Age Group swimmers (11- to 14-year-old boys and 11- to 13-year-old girls); one for Youth swimmers (15- to 18-year-old boys and 14- to 18-year-old girls) and one for Masters (age 25 years old plus) usually in July/August. Often the championships are merged. They also hold open water nationals each year. The following table shows the 'Open' Championships.

Sponsorship 

In 2009 British Swimming announced a £15 million, 6-year sponsorship deal with British Gas, to cover the Home Country Associations too.

References

External links
  Official site

Swimming organizations
Swimming in England
Swimming
Sport in Loughborough
Organisations based in Leicestershire
Sports organizations established in 1869
1869 establishments in England
Amateur sport in the United Kingdom